Michelle Young may refer to:

 Michelle Young (musician), American musician
 Michelle Young (television personality) (born 1993), American television personality